Peter John Roach (born 30 June 1943) is a British retired phonetician. He taught at the Universities of Leeds and Reading, and is best known for his work on the pronunciation of British English.

Education
Peter Roach studied Classics at the Priory Grammar School for Boys, Shrewsbury. At Oxford University (Brasenose College, 1962–1966) he took Classical Honour Moderations before graduating in psychology and philosophy (PPP). He studied teaching English overseas at Manchester University then went on to University College London to take a postgraduate course in phonetics.  Later, while a lecturer at the University of Reading, he completed a PhD which was awarded in 1978.

Career
From 1968 to 1978 he was Lecturer in Phonetics at the University of Reading, UK, and for the academic year 1975–1976 was Profesor Encargado de Curso in the Department of English at the University of Seville, Spain, on leave from Reading University. He moved to the University of Leeds in 1978, initially as Senior Lecturer in Phonetics. Subsequently, after moving to the Department of Psychology, he was appointed Professor of Cognitive Psychology. He returned to the University of Reading in 1994 as Professor of Phonetics, later becoming head of the School of Linguistics and Applied Language Studies. He retired in 2004 with the title of Emeritus Professor of Phonetics.

Writing
His best-known publication is English Phonetics and Phonology (C.U.P.). The book was first published in 1983 and is now in its 4th edition (2009). An enhanced e-book edition was published in 2013. He has been the principal editor of the Cambridge English Pronouncing Dictionary for all editions from the 15th (1997) to the current 18th (2011) which is also published in CD-ROM format and an Apple app. Other books include Phonetics (OUP, 2001), in the series 'Oxford Introductions to Language Study', and Introducing Phonetics (Penguin, 1992). Since the latter became out of print, Roach has made it available in PDF format on the internet as A Little Encyclopaedia of Phonetics. He has published a large number of research papers and been an invited speaker in fifteen countries.

Research
He has held a number of grants for speech research. He was principal investigator of the ESRC-funded project that resulted in the MARSEC machine-readable version of the Spoken English Corpus, and was project director of the European-funded project that produced the BABEL multi-language speech corpus. He was a partner in the European project SPECO that produced a computer-based training system to improve deaf children's speech.

Selected publications

Books
Roach, Peter (ed.) (1992) Computing in Linguistics and Phonetics, Academic Press. 
Roach, Peter (2001) Phonetics, Oxford University Press (Oxford Introductions to Language Studies series) 
Roach, Peter (2009) English Phonetics and Phonology, Fourth Edition, Cambridge University Press;  (2013, Enhanced E-book edition)
Roach, P., Esling, J. and Setter, J. (2011) (original editor Daniel Jones) The Cambridge English Pronouncing Dictionary, 18th Edition, Cambridge University Press,

Papers

Roach, P.J (1982). 'On the distinction between "stress-timed" and "syllable-timed" languages', in D.Crystal (ed.) Linguistic Controversies, pp. 73–79, London, Edward Arnold

Roach, P.J. and Arnfield, S.C. (1995) ‘Linking prosodic transcription to the time dimension’, in G.Leech, G.Myers and J.Thomas (eds.) Spoken English on Computer, Longman, pp. 149–160 
Roach, P. (1998) ‘Some languages are spoken more quickly than others’, in L. Bauer and P. Trudgill (eds) Language Myths, Penguin, pp. 150–9
Roach, P. (2000) 'Techniques for the description of emotional speech', Proceedings of the ISCA Workshop on Speech and Emotion, (eds. R.Cowie, E. Douglas-Cowie and M. Schroeder), pp. 53–59
Roach, P.J. (2004) 'Illustrations of the IPA. British English: Received Pronunciation', Journal of the IPA, vol. 34.2, pp. 239–245
Roach, P.J. (2004) 'Representing the English Model', in K. Dzubialska and J. Przedlacka (eds) English Pronunciation Models: A Changing Scene, Peter Lang, pp. 393–399

References

Alumni of University College London
Academics of the University of Reading
Linguists from the United Kingdom
Academics of the University of Leeds
Phoneticians
Alumni of the University of Manchester
Alumni of Brasenose College, Oxford
1943 births
Living people
People educated at The Priory Boys' Grammar School, Shrewsbury